Jan Erik Skog (born 1945) is a Norwegian electrician, trade unionist and whistleblower. He received the Fritt Ord Award in 2015, shared with Robin Schaefer.

References

1945 births
Living people
Norwegian trade unionists